The Coughee Brothaz (formerly known as the Odd Squad) is a Southern hip-hop trio consisting of Devin the Dude, Jugg Mugg and Rob Quest.

Origin 
The group members Devin and Rob met at a 1989 talent show sponsored by Kurtis Blow. Devin lost the contest but was greatly impressed by Rob's performance.

He and Rob became close friends and eventually Devin's friend Dexter Johnson came along as well. With Rob's production, the group recorded a series of demos and befriended many of their future label-mates and affiliates such as Big Mike, UGK, and DJ Screw.

Deciding to get more serious about their career, the group slid a demo to Rap-A-Lot house producer Crazy C, who had previously produced almost the whole of Mr. Scarface is Back.

The demo then made it to label head James Prince. He soon offered them a recording contract and Rob handled the bulk of the album production with the group writing all the tracks with aid from such staple southern producers as Mike Dean, N.O Joe and John Bido.

Music 
Their first album, Fadanuf Fa Erybody!! was released on February 1, 1994 under Rap-A-Lot Records.  The album is considered by Scarface to be the label's finest release.

Despite much praise, the album was a failure, reaching only #66 on the Top R&B/Hip-Hop Albums. Soon after, Devin would join Scarface's protege group Facemob before going solo in 1998. His ties with the Odd Squad however continued.

Odd Squad 
Whereas Odd Squad is the group, Coughee Brothaz is the clique, consisting of an innumerable number of members, thus unlimited amount of talent. Coughee Brothaz, founded by Odd Squad released the albums Waitin' Our Turn in 2007 and Fresh Brew in 2011.
The term "coughee" was created by Original Coughee Brothaz Tony and Boomer (Cleo) Father. Who suggested that the teens find another way to express themselves. HE (Pops) suggested calling it Coughee. Thus the Coughee Brothaz shortly followed. Devin the dude, Odd Squad front man, coined the phrase creating a platform for all of artists, producers, singers, writers etc. of His clique -So they might have an opportunity to showcase their talents.

In a 2019 podcast interview with Donnie Houston, Rob Quest stated: “Coughee is a code word that one of our friends made up that he would use in front of his parents, he had elderly parents, so people would come over…he would be like ‘hey man we out back sippin’ coughee’… that was code for ‘I got one in the air in the back, come hit the weed.’”

References

External links
 Charles, Jeff. "Odd Squad, 2 Low, Yaggfu Front/Rap-A-Lot scores without gangsta and with; N.C. trio out for `Action'." Houston Chronicle. Sunday March 6, 1994. Zest 6.

American hip hop groups
Southern hip hop groups
American musical trios